The Illuminated is the debut novel of Anindita Ghose, a writer, journalist and editor based in Mumbai. It was published by 4th Estate Harper Collins in July 2021 in India  and by Head of Zeus (Bloomsbury) internationally in January 2023.

Summary 
The novel explores the relationships between a mother and her daughter and the men in their lives, set against the backdrop of a rising tide of religious fundamentalism in India. It employs the lunar motif as a literary device to establish an alternative perspective.

Reception 
The novel received largely favourable reviews  in the press and has been featured on best fiction lists by The Telegraph, The Times of India,GQ  and Cosmopolitan U.K. 

Harper's Bazaar Australia said fans of Nora Ephron, Otttessa Moshfegh, Sally Rooney and Ali Smith would favour the book. 

In The Irish Independent, Anne Cunningham called it "An extremely elegant work, an interesting take on the universality of feminism from a uniquely Indian perspective." 

The Straits Times called it a nuanced exploration of grief and identity. 

The Scroll.in reviewed it as "perfectly timed" and "quietly, non-performatively political, exploring the possibilities of a world sliding into increasing iniquitousness."

The Financial Express described it as "audacious and assured" and "a gauntlet thrown down to the status quo."

The New Indian Express wrote in their review: "While it has been widely described as a novel about the changing contours of a mother-daughter relationship, there is a lot more going on. This book is also about loneliness in marriage, liberation in widowhood, sexual exploitation in academia, women in politics, and the confusing nature of desire, and the heartbreak of families spread out over continents."

References

2021 debut novels
2021 Indian novels